Bond Point is a small ice-free headland on the south coast of western Livingston Island in the South Shetland Islands, Antarctica forming the northeast side of the entrance to Kavarna Cove. Linzipar Lake is situated at the point's base. The area was visited by early 19th century sealers.

The feature is named after Captain Ralph Bond, Master of the British sealing vessel Hetty who operated in the South Shetlands in 1820-21 and provided Captain George Powell with descriptions of their south coasts for incorporation in his 1822 chart.

Location

Maps
 Chart of South Shetland including Coronation Island, &c. from the exploration of the sloop Dove in the years 1821 and 1822 by George Powell Commander of the same. Scale ca. 1:200000. London: Laurie, 1822.
 L.L. Ivanov et al. Antarctica: Livingston Island and Greenwich Island, South Shetland Islands. Scale 1:100000 topographic map. Sofia: Antarctic Place-names Commission of Bulgaria, 2005.
 L.L. Ivanov. Antarctica: Livingston Island and Greenwich, Robert, Snow and Smith Islands. Scale 1:120000 topographic map.  Troyan: Manfred Wörner Foundation, 2009.

References
Composite Antarctic Gazetteer.

Headlands of Livingston Island